The 1968–69 Liga Alef season saw Maccabi Petah Tikva (champions of the North Division) and Beitar Tel Aviv (champions of the South Division) win the title and promotion to Liga Leumit.

North Division

South Division

References
Beitar Tel Aviv returned to Leumit after two seasons Maariv, 8.6.69, Historical Jewish Press 
Previous seasons The Israel Football Association 

Liga Alef seasons
Israel
2